Capon is a Norman French surname, from the Old French Chapon or Chapelain meaning a 'chantry priest'. The name ultimately derives from the Latin Capellanus. Notable people with the surname include:

Brecht Capon (born 1988), Belgian football striker
Edmund Capon (1940–2019), British-Australian art scholar
John Capon (died 1557), Benedictine monk
Laura Capon Fermi (1907–1977), Italian and naturalized-American writer and political activist. She was the wife of Nobel Prize physicist Enrico Fermi.
Paul Capon (1912–1969), British writer
Robert Farrar Capon (1925–2013), American Episcopal priest and author
Stephen Capon (1927–2017), English cricketer
William Capon (1480–1550), Fellow of Jesus College
William Capon (artist) (1757–1827), painter and scene designer
Charles R. Capon (artist) (1884-1954), illustrator